Anca Mițicuș (born 1 May 1997), formerly known as Anca Polocoșer, is a Romanian handballer for Minaur Baia Mare and the Romanian national team.

International honours 
European League:
Bronze Medalist: 2021

Junior World Championship:
Bronze Medalist: 2016

Trofeul Carpaţi:
Second place: 2018

Individual awards
 Maramureș County Sportswoman of the Year: 2016

References

External links

 

1997 births
Living people
Sportspeople from Suceava
Romanian female handball players
CS Minaur Baia Mare (women's handball) players